Vilanova may refer to:

People
Amanda Vilanova (born 1991), Puerto Rican beauty pageant title holder
Francisco Machón Vilanova, Salvadoran novelist
Galcerand de Vilanova, Bishop of Urgel and Co-Prince of Andorra 
João Batista Vilanova Artigas (1912-1985), Brazilian architect
Marc Bertrán Vilanova (born 1982), Spanish footballer
Sandra Vilanova (born 1981), Spanish footballer
Tito Vilanova (1968-2014), Spanish footballer and manager
Xavier Vilanova i Montiu (1902-1965), Catalan dermatologist

Places

Brazil
Fazenda Vilanova, municipality in the state Rio Grande do Sul

Spain

Asturias
Villanueva de Oscos, (Galician-Asturian: Vilanova d'Ozcos) municipality in the comarca of Eo-Navia

Catalonia
Vilanova d'Escornalbou, village in the province of Tarragona
Vilanova de Bellpuig, village in the province of Lleida
Vilanova de l'Aguda, municipality in the province of Lleida
Vilanova de Meià, municipality in the province of Lleida
Vilanova de Prades, municipality in the province of Tarragona
Vilanova de Sau, town in the province of Barcelona
Vilanova de Segrià, village in the province of Lleida
Vilanova del Camí, municipality in the province of Barcelona
Vilanova del Vallès, village in the province of Barcelona
Vilanova de la Barca,  municipality in the province of Lleida
Vilanova i la Geltrú, city in the province of Barcelona

Galicia
Vilanova de Arousa, municipality in the province of Pontevedra

Valencian Community
Vilanova d'Alcolea, a municipality in the province of Castelló

Sports
CF Vilanova, football team from Vilanova i la Geltrú
CP Vilanova, roller hockey team from Vilanova i la Geltrú

Other
Battle of Vilanova, battle of the Portuguese Restoration War
Diari de Vilanova, newspaper published in Garraf, Catalonia
Vilanova International World Music Festival, multicultural festival of music, workshops and conferences

See also
Vila Nova (disambiguation)
Villa Nova (disambiguation)
Villanova (disambiguation)
Villanueva (disambiguation)
Villeneuve (disambiguation)